Konyali (from Konya) is a Turkish folkloric tune, song, and dance, mainly in the form of kaşık havası. The meter is 4/4. The makam is hüseyni. It is a part of Turkish as well as Greek culture, specifically that of the Karamanlides, Cappadocian Greeks, Pontians, and other sub-groups. There are similar folkloric dance tunes known as η βράκα  in Cyprus.

See also
Kaşık Havası
Ballos
Syrtos
Lamba Da Şişesiz Yanmaz Mı

References

Turkish music
Turkish songs
Greek dances
Year of song unknown